The winter of 1962–1963, known as the Big Freeze of 1963, was one of the coldest winters (defined as the months of December, January and February) on record in the United Kingdom. Temperatures plummeted and lakes and rivers began to freeze over.

In the Central England Temperature (CET) record extending back to 1659, only the winters of 1683–1684 and 1739–1740 were colder than 1962–1963. The winter of 1962–1963 remains the coldest since at least 1895 in all meteorological districts of the United Kingdom, although in Scotland North the winter of 2009–2010 was equally cold. The winter of 1894–1895 was colder than that of 1962–1963 in Scotland North and Scotland East, whilst, although instrumental temperature data for Scotland and Northern Ireland do not extend back to 1740, station data from subsequent years suggest that the winters of 1813–1814 and 1878–1879 were almost certainly colder than 1962–1963 over Scotland and Northern Ireland, and that the winter of 1779–1780 may also have been colder over Scotland.

December 1962 
A wintry outbreak brought snow to the country on 12–13 December 1962. A cold easterly set in on 22 December as an anticyclone formed over Scandinavia, drawing cold continental winds from Russia. Throughout the Christmas period, the Scandinavian high collapsed, but a new high formed near Iceland, bringing northerly winds. Significant snowfall occurred as the air mass moved south, and parts of Southern England had heavy snow late on 26–27 December. The cold air became firmly established.

29 and 30 December 1962 
On 29 and 30 December 1962 a blizzard swept across South West England and Wales. The snow stranded villagers and brought down power lines. The near-freezing temperatures meant that the snow cover lasted for more than two months in some areas.

January 1963 

Much of England and Wales was covered in snow throughout the month. Freezing fog was a hazard for most of the country.

At various locations in the UK, it had been the coldest January on record for long established stations such as Newquay and Ross-on-Wye with the coldest January on record since 1891 and 1877 respectively. It was the coldest January at Kew since 1838.

The sea froze inshore in many places, removing many British inland water birds' usual last resort of finding food in estuaries and shallow sea. The sea froze  out to sea from Dunkirk. The upper reaches of the River Thames froze over, although it did not freeze in Central London, partly due to the hot effluent from two thermal power stations, Battersea and Bankside. The removal of the multi-arched London Bridge, which had obstructed the river's free flow, and the addition of the river embankments, kept the river from freezing in London as it had in earlier times (see River Thames frost fairs).

On 20 January, 283 workers had to be rescued by RAF helicopters from Fylingdales, where they had been snowbound for several days. The ice was thick enough in some places that people were skating on it, and on 22 January a car was driven across the frozen Thames at Oxford.

On 25 January there was a brief thaw that lasted three days.

February 1963 
Snow continued to fall in February 1963, which was stormy with winds reaching Force 8 on the Beaufort scale (gale-force winds).

A 36-hour blizzard caused heavy drifting snow in most parts of the country.

March 1963 
6 March was the first morning of the year without frost in Britain. The thaw was gradual, and unlike 1947 there was no widespread flooding.

Effect on sport 
Sport was disrupted in the winter of 1962–1963 in the UK. Football matches in the English and Scottish leagues suffered because of the severe effects of the winter weather. Some matches in the FA Cup with tied scores were rescheduled ten or more times. Matches in the fifth and sixth rounds, scheduled for 16 February and 9 March respectively, were played on 16 and 30 March. A board known as the Pools Panel was set up to adjudicate postponed matches to provide the football pool results. From 8 December to 16 February, Bolton Wanderers played no competitive matches. Both codes of rugby, union and league, suffered much the same fate. The delays occurred before under-soil heating became widespread at major venues. When the thaw arrived, a backlog of fixtures had to be hastily determined. The Football League season was extended by four weeks from its original finishing date of 27 April. The final league fixtures (scheduled sports events) took place one day before the rescheduled FA Cup Final. Some lower-level competitions did not complete the season.

National Hunt horse racing was also affected by the weather. Ninety-four meetings were cancelled during the freeze. There was no racing in England between 23 December and 7 March, although a meeting at Ayr in Scotland occurred on 5 January.

In popular culture

The cold of the winter of 1962–1963 is referred to in Dream Academy's 1985 hit single "Life in a Northern Town". The lyrics include the phrase "In winter 1963 / It felt like the world would freeze".

The 2017 Christmas special and first episode of season seven of Call the Midwife were set during the winter of 1962–1963. The cold was a factor in several of the drama's plot points. Actress Jenny Agutter, who plays Sister Julienne, wrote an article in The Times about her memories of the 1962–63 winter to coincide with the Christmas special.

Several episodes of the television drama series The Edgar Wallace Mysteries were filmed during the 1962–1963 winter, and the effects of the Big Freeze on both urban and rural locations were captured on film.

The crime film Calculated Risk was filmed during The Big Freeze and makes ample use of the weather, with music composed by George Martin, while working with The Beatles.

See also 

Great Frost of 1709
Winter of 1946–1947 in the United Kingdom
January 1987 Southeast England snowfall
Winter of 1990–1991 in Western Europe
European winter storms of 2009–2010
Winter storms of 2009–2010 in Great Britain and Ireland
The European winter cold snap of 2010-2011

Notes

References 

General

L.P. Smith, Seasonable Weather, George Allen & Unwin Ltd, 1968, p133
The winter of 1962/63
Another summary page

External links 
"Snow Survey of Great Britain: Season 1962-3" by R.E. Booth
Account of the big freeze in Windsor
local newspaper history  coverage
The Long Winter 1962–63 Guardian Newspaper coverage

Video links 
 BFI documentary about snow and the railways
 BBC World Service Radio Report New Years Eve 1962
  Pathe newsreel, February 1963, snow affecting railway in kent
 Pathe newsreel, January 1963, athletics
 Pathe newsreel, January 1963, helicopter feeding livestock

Cold wave
Cold wave
United Kingdom cold wave
United Kingdom cold wave
December 1962 events in the United Kingdom
January 1963 events in the United Kingdom
February 1963 events in the United Kingdom
March 1963 events in the United Kingdom
Cold waves in the United Kingdom
Winter 1962 UK
Winter weather events in the United Kingdom